The Al-Saada Stadium, also known as Al-Saada Sports Complex is a government owned multi-use stadium in the Al-Saada district of Salalah, Oman.  The stadium is used only for football matches and is the home stadium of Salalah-based clubs Dhofar, and Al-Nasr. The stadium has originally had a capacity of an estimated 12,000 people, but due to renovation in 2010 the stadium became an all-seater decreasing the maximum capacity to an estimated 8-9,000 spectators.  Although being opened officially in 2009, the stadium ever since has been undergoing renovation, and because of protest from the football community in the city because of the unexpected outcome, the stadium has undergone a plan to eventually house close to 20,000 spectators.

Aside from the stadium itself, there is also a sports complex housed within the compound, which includes a hockey field, tennis court, Olympic-size swimming pool, and an indoor volleyball/basketball stadium.

Unlike the Salalah Sports Complex located in the Auwqad district of Salalah, the Al-Saada Stadium features seating completely around the field, and does not include a running track, making the atmosphere more powerful and closer to the action.

Controversy

The stadium has been subject to criticism, especially from influential people in Salalah.  Omani newspaper, Al-Shabiba has published an article on February 1, 2010 منتديات كووورة about the stadium by writer, Mohammed Al-Rawas pointing out the main issues with the stadium.  In it, it states that it has taken much longer than expected for it to finish, no seating whatsoever was installed, and the end result was just not what was expected.  The article also mentions no installation of a parking lot.

Abdul-Hakim Ba-Mukhalaf, Ali Al-Ra'ood, Nayyif Al-Marhoon, and Dhofar S.C. president, Badr bin Ali Al-Rawas also join writer, Mohammed Al-Rawas in the long article criticizing the construction, planning, and disappointing end-result of the stadium.

According to Al-Shabiba's article from February 1, 2010, the stadium was planned to be completely finished in 15 months, but in fact, it has taken nearly 4 years and is still experiencing construction.

The leading football forum in the Arab World, Kooora.com has also been the place of criticism towards the stadium with various members opening threads explaining their disappointment in the outcome.

KooooraWaBas has also written an article about the stadium explaining the poor managing and planning of the stadium, lack of giving live feeds of matches, and no match clock installed.

Tenants
Al-Saada Stadium is the new home to Dhofar FC as well as Al-Nasr FC, replacing their old home; the Salalah Sports Complex. The stadium also hosts various teams from Salalah in the second division, as well as Mirbat.

Trivia
 The first international friendly between Saudi Arabia and Oman in Salalah was held in 2009 in this stadium.
 Location of this stadium is close to the ongoing construction of the new location of the Dhofar University.
 Many times the venue is confused with the Salalah Sports Complex when Dhofari clubs play home matches.

Gallery

References

External links
 Kooora.com reports the Al-Shabiba article from February 1, 2010, about the Al-Saada Stadium
 Al-Shabiba article (different source)
 Omanet.com info about the stadium
 Al-Watan newspaper report on the Al-Saada Stadium
 KooooraWaBas article on Al-Saada Stadium
 Al-Nasr's official website posted pictures of the stadium under construction
 Youtube video of Oman vs. K.S.A. spectator POV before match
 Stadium pictures
 Frank Jasperneite page

Football venues in Oman
Sports venues in Oman